Debonair or Debonaire may refer to:

 Debonair (airline), a British airline that operated from 1996 to 1999
 Debonair (magazine), an Indian men's magazine
 Debonair (play), a 1930 British play by Frank Vosper
 Beechcraft Debonair, a model variant of the Beechcraft Bonanza aircraft
 Mitsubishi Debonair, an automobile
 The Debonaires, the early name of The Flairs, an American doo wop group
 "Debonair", a song by The Afghan Whigs from the 1993 album Gentlemen
 Debonaire, a 2016 album by Ike Moriz
 "Debonaire", a song by Dope from the 1999 album Felons and Revolutionaries
 Debonairs Pizza, a South African based pizza restaurant chain

See also

 Thangam Debbonaire (born 1966), British politician
 DevonAir, a former local radio station